The 2020–21 Luxembourg National Division season was the 106th of top-tier association football in Luxembourg. The season began on 22 August 2020 and ended on 30 May 2021. The league winners qualified to participate in the 2021–22 UEFA Champions League.

Teams
No teams were relegated at the end of the previous season. As a result, the league expanded to 16 teams. Swift Hesperange and Wiltz earned promotion from the Luxembourg Division of Honour and competed in the league this season.

Stadia and locations

League table

Results
Each team will play every other team in the league twice for a total of 30 matches each.

See also
 Luxembourg Cup
 Luxembourg Division of Honour

References

External links
 

1
Luxembourg National Division seasons
Luxembourg